Wen Shuo (born 5 January 1991) is a Chinese footballer currently playing as a right winger for Shaanxi Chang'an Athletic.

Career statistics

Club
.

References

1991 births
Living people
Chinese footballers
Chinese expatriate footballers
Association football forwards
Segunda Divisão players
China League Two players
China League One players
Shandong Taishan F.C. players
C.D. Mafra players
Guangzhou City F.C. players
Yunnan Flying Tigers F.C. players
Shaanxi Chang'an Athletic F.C. players
Chinese expatriate sportspeople in Portugal
Expatriate footballers in Portugal